Mitchell Christopher Cook (born 15 October 1961) is an English retired professional footballer. He played for seven different Football League clubs during a twenty-year career, and had four separate spells at Scarborough, his hometown club. He later coached at the club and ran the club's Centre of Excellence and Football in the Community sections until the club's demise in 2007, whereupon he moved the youth system, community section and Under-19 team of Scarborough F.C. to George Pindar Community Sports College on the outskirts of town.

In 2008, Cook was appointed Director of Football for the newly formed Scarborough Town F.C., an adult extension of the Under-19 Academy and which he led to the championship of Teesside League Division Two in 2008–09, whilst his youth team won the "double" in the Northern Under-19 Alliance (Eastern Division). In 2009–10 he guided Scarborough Town to the championship of the Wearside League (Step 7) with the team also winning the prestigious Sunderland Shipowners Cup. The youth team retained its title in the Northern Under-19 Alliance.

In October 2010, Cook replaced Mark Ward as the manager of Pickering Town, taking control of both the first team and the under 19 side. After one season at the club, he left in May 2011 to take over at Bridlington Town.

Honours

As a player 
Scarborough
 Football Conference: 1986–87

Blackpool
 Football League Fourth Division play-offs: 1992
 Lancashire Senior Cup: 1993–94

Whitby Town
 Northern League: 1996–97
 FA Vase: 1996–97

References

External links

Whatever happened to ... 

1961 births
Living people
Sportspeople from Scarborough, North Yorkshire
English footballers
Scarborough F.C. players
Darlington F.C. players
Middlesbrough F.C. players
Halifax Town A.F.C. players
Blackpool F.C. players
Hartlepool United F.C. players
Scarborough F.C. managers
Guiseley A.F.C. players
Whitby Town F.C. players
English Football League players
Footballers from North Yorkshire
Association football defenders
English football managers